Llano Tugrí or Buabïti, also referred to as Buabidi, Buabti, and Buäbti, is the capital of Comarca Ngäbe-Buglé, Panama. It is located in the village of Peña Blanca in the district of Müna. It is surrounded by mountains and is characterized by a pleasant climate.

Llano Tugrí can be accessed from San Felix, Province of Chiriqui.

References

Populated places in Ngöbe-Buglé Comarca